William Campion (6 February 1640 – 20 September 1702) was an English politician who sat in the House of Commons between 1689 and 1702.
 
Campion was the son of Sir William Campion of Combwell, and his wife Grace Parker, daughter of Sir Thomas Parker of Ratton Sussex. He was educated at Trinity College, Cambridge, and admitted to Middle Temple in 1657.

Campion was elected Member of Parliament for Seaford in 1689 and held the seat until July 1698. He was then re-elected for Seaford in December 1698 and held the seat until 1701. In 1701 he was elected MP for Kent and held the seat until his death in 1702.

Campion died aged 62 and was buried at St. Mary's church in Goudhurst.

References

1640 births
1702 deaths
Members of the Middle Temple
Alumni of Trinity College, Cambridge
People from Seaford, East Sussex
Place of birth missing
English MPs 1689–1690
English MPs 1690–1695
English MPs 1695–1698
English MPs 1698–1700
English MPs 1701–1702